Pubs, Trucks & Plains is a 3-CD set, compilation album released by Australian country music singer Slim Dusty. The album was released in March 2007 to celebrate the 50th anniversary of his single "A Pub with No Beer"; which was the biggest-selling record by an Australian at that time, the first Australian single to be certified gold.

Pubs, Trucks & Plains peaked at number 20 on the ARIA charts and was certified gold.

Track listing
 CD1	
 "A Pub with No Beer" (1979 version)- 3:01	
 "Born with an Endless Thirst" - 4:31
 "The Bloke Who Serves the Beer" - 3:01
 "Duncan" - 2:35
 "Must've Been a Hello of a Party" (live)- 2:59
 "Three Rivers Hotel" - 3:22
 "Wobbly Boot" (featuring Rolf Harris) - 2:58
 "He's a Good Bloke When He's Sober" - 3:37
 "Drowning My Blues" - 2:29
 "Brown Bottle Blues" - 2:52
 "Old Bush Pub" - 2:43
 "Callaghan's Hotel" - 2:47
 "Pay Day at the Pub" - 3:18
 "Joe Maguire's Pub" - 2:58
 "Nebo Pub" - 3:06
 "Finney's Home Brew" - 3:43
 "Little Old One Horse Pub" - 2:37	
 "The Pub Rock" - 2:34	
 "The Answer to the Pub with No Beer" - 2:48
 "A Pub with No Beer" (1957 version) - 2:58	

CD2	
 "No Good Truckin' Man" - 2:30
 "Bent-Axle Bob" - 2:47
 "Under the Spell of Highway One" - 3:40
 "Pushin' Time" - 2:54	
 "Long Black Road" - 3:18
 "Names Upon the Wall" - 3:19
 "Gotta Keep Movin'" - 3:11
 "Truckin's in My Blood" - 3:11
 "Dieseline Dreams" - 3:22
 "The Lady Is a Truckie" - 3:31
 "Rolling Down the Road" - 4:07
 "Kelly's Offsider" - 3:24
 "Star Trucker" - 4:13	
 "Highway One" - 3:07	
 "Something in the Pilliga" - 4:00
 "Trucks, Tarps and Trailers" - 3:29
 "Sally (The Girl on Channel 8)" - 4:07
 "Mechanised Swaggie" - 3:17
 "Lights on the Hill" - 3:03		
 "One Truckie's Epitaph" - 3:33

CD3		
 "Hard, Hard Country" - 2:31
 "Back to the Old Saltbush Plains" - 2:09
 "When the Rain Tumbles Down in July" - 2:43
 "Land of No Second Chance" - 3:42
 "The Birdsville Track" - 3:15
 "Plains of Peppimenarti" - 3:15
 "By a Fire of Gidgee Coal" - 3:01
 "Things I See Around Me" - 2:39
 "Indian Pacific" - 3:31	
 Cattlemen from the High Plains" - 3:10	
 "Things Are Not the Same on the Land" - 3:02
 "Walk a Country Mile" - 2:53		
 "Cunnamulla Fella" - 2:13	
 "Keela Valley" (credited to His Bushlanders)- 2:22
 "Paddy William" - 4:33
 "The Drovers are Back" - 3:08	
 "Trumby" - 3:29
 "Gumtrees by the Roadway" (live) - 2:59	
 "The Man from Snowy River" - 7:47
 "End of the Bitumen" - 4:10

Charts

Weekly charts

Year-end charts

Certifications

Release history

References

Slim Dusty albums
2007 albums
Compilation albums by Australian artists
EMI Records albums